Richard Milburn or "Whistling Dick" was a nineteenth-century African American composer and barber. Milburn cut hair in his father's shop on Lombard Street in Philadelphia.  He played the guitar, and he often whistled tunes while he worked. He composed "Listen to the Mocking Bird", which, arranged by Septimus Winner, became one of the most popular ballads of the era, selling more than twenty million copies of sheet music at the time. Milburn is not credited on the sheet music, nor paid for the composition. Winner later sold the rights for five dollars.

References

Bibliography
Sean Wilentz, The Rise of American Democracy: Jefferson to Lincoln. W.W. Norton & Co. Illustrated edition, 2007,

External links
Sheet Music for "Listen to the Mocking Bird", 1856.
Sean Wilentz, Princeton Professor and civil war historian.

American male songwriters